The Houston–Rice rivalry is a crosstown college rivalry between the Houston Cougars of the University of Houston and Rice Owls of Rice University.  The universities are located approximately five miles from one another.  It is one of the few NCAA Division I crosstown rivalries, especially between institutions that field Division I Football Bowl Subdivision teams.

The rivalry existed in a more official capacity after Houston joined the now-defunct Southwest Conference in 1971, in which Rice was a charter member. Since the breakup of that conference in 1995, the rivalry has continued. In 2005, Rice joined Conference USA, of which Houston was a member, and again made the rivalry more relevant for conference titles as well. The two schools were once again in separate conferences after the 2012–13 school year once Houston joined the American Athletic Conference.

Baseball

The winner of the Silver Glove series between UH and Rice receives an award dubbed the "Silver Cup Trophy".  The teams played against each other for the first time in 1948. Through the 2022 season, Rice leads the series 109–85.

Both teams compete in the annual Houston College Classic, which began in 2001.

Men's basketball

Since 2002, Rice and Houston have competed for an award dubbed the "Bayou Cup" in men's basketball.  The series between the teams exists with Houston leading 65–18.

Game results
Rankings are from the AP Poll released prior to the game.

Notes
A 1978 Southwest Conference men's basketball tournament
B 1980 Southwest Conference men's basketball tournament
C 1984 Southwest Conference men's basketball tournament
D 1990 Southwest Conference men's basketball tournament
E 2007 Conference USA men's basketball tournament
F 2013 Conference USA men's basketball tournament

Football

The football rivalry, sometimes referred to as the Bayou Bucket Classic, is the longest running competition between the two institutions.  Both teams are part of the NCAA's Division I Football Bowl Subdivision.  

The first official game between the teams was played in 1971 when Houston joined the now-defunct Southwest Conference of which Rice was also a member. The teams previously met in a 1946 scrimmage marking Houston's inaugural season.  For many years the competition included an annual regular-season football game between the schools. The winner of the game receives the Bayou Bucket, which is a full-sized trophy with a golden bucket on top.  

Although the last Southwest Conference football game was part of the series, the teams did not compete against each other in football from 1996 to 1998 and from 2014 to 2016. However, they still play as non-conference foes as future schedules allow. Houston leads this series 33–11 through the 2022 season.

Game results
Rankings are from the AP Poll released prior to the game.

References

College football rivalries in the United States
College basketball rivalries in the United States
College baseball rivalries in the United States
College sports rivalries in the United States
Houston Cougars
Rice Owls